Kemal Tekden (born January 1, 1959) is a Turkish politician and businessman.

Biography 
Kemal Tekden graduated from Istanbul University Faculty of Medicine. Leaving the civil service in 1993, he opened the first private medical center in Kayseri. Later on, he ventured into politics, having announced his candidacy for the membership of the parliament of Kayseri for the 7 June elections in 2014, becoming one of the 500 deputies from the 4th rank with the AK Party, which won 317 seats. He is married and has three children. He is also one of the producers of the series, Diriliş: Ertuğrul on TRT 1.

Filmography
Diriliş: Ertuğrul (2014) - executive producer

References

External links
 

1959 births
Living people
People from Kayseri
Turkish politicians